Chinmaya Vidyalaya, Kollam is a senior secondary school established by Chinmaya Educational, Cultural and Charitable Trust in Kollam city on 23 October 1985. The schools is situated on a 3.01 acre campus at Kuzhiyam road in Chandanathope (Reg No. 930434). The school currently teaches students in the Pre-Primary, LP, UP, HS & plus Two sections.

Facilities
 Play School
 Playground
 Indoor Games
 Labs
 Library
 Health & Medical Facilities
 Transportation Facility

References

Educational institutions established in 1985
K
Private schools in Kerala
1985 establishments in Kerala
High schools and secondary schools in Kerala
Schools in Kollam
Primary schools in Kerala